Coprosma robusta, commonly known as karamu, is a flowering plant in the family Rubiaceae that is endemic to New Zealand. It can survive in many climates, but is most commonly found in coastal areas, lowland forests, or shrublands. Karamu is used for a variety of purposes in human culture. The fruit that karamu produces can be eaten, and the shoots of karamu are sometimes used for medical purposes.

Identification

Species description
Branches are stout with no hair. Domatia (small holes on the back of the leaf at the intersection of veins) and stipules are significant characteristic features of Coprosmas. Karamu stipules are black, hairless and obtuse with slightly serrated margin that are united at the base

Leaves
Leaves are dark green on the blade and light green on the back, are thick, and the midrib is not raised on the upper surface.

Flower
Flowers are small and white, axillary, dense, have four lobes and have a different appearance in male and females. Male flowers are dense, glomerules with a campanulate shaped corolla and have four stamens; female flowers are compound with a tubular shaped corolla. Stigmas are obvious. The best flowering period is between August and September.

Fruit

Fruit are often dark orange-red to red, oblong to narrow ovate drups. The best fruiting period is between April and May.

Distribution and habitat

Natural global range
Karamu is endemic to New Zealand. However, it is gradually becoming naturalized in areas of the south-east coast of Australia such as Victoria and Tasmania and has been rated as a weed threat there.

New Zealand range
It is widely distributed across New Zealand in both the North and South Islands.  On the Chatham Islands between Waitangi and Owenga, there is a small area where karamu has become naturalized. They can often be observed naturally in lowland forest. Judging from the distribution map on New Zealand Plant Observation, the distribution of karamu increases with the differentiation in lower altitude which means more karamu in the North Island.

In Canterbury, karamu is found on Banks Peninsula in fragments of regenerating native bush and bush remnants. Additionally it is also found in forest margins and edges of the montane and lowland forests in the southern alps at the start of the Canterbury planes. Karamu can also be found in the urban environment of many Christchurch city green spaces (e.g. park like Riccarton Bush).

Habitat preferences
Karamu can be widely found near coastal, lowland and lower montane areas. It can also grow within shrub lands and expansive areas within dense trees such as lowland forest. However, the population decreases in lowland forest such as beech and kahikatea forests. Normally karamu is a hardy plant that can adapt to infertile soils, poorly drained and exposed lands. It can also grow in a large range of altitude varying from  under full sun to shady, windy and frosty circumstances.

Life cycle/phenology
In New Zealand the flowering season of karamu is from winter (approximately from July) to summer (ends around December). Male and female flowers are separated which is called dioecious. Seeds mature by about April and start germinating soon afterwards and doesn't leave a long lasting seed bank.

The seed is largely dispersed by birds which eat the fruit. Due to its hardy characteristics, it is easy growing from seed even on open sites.
Again, as mentioned before, the best season for C. robusta fruiting is between April and May. It would finally grow up to six meters high and will normally act as a secondary succession plant during this process.

Ecology

Growing conditions
Karamu is an extremely hardy plant that can grow in a large range of environmental conditions from full sun to shady, from dry to moist, and can tolerate frost and wind. It grows best in a moist soil which is not too acid, although they have the ability to live in poor soils. They can also be found in coastal conditions, lowland scrub, swamps and rock associations.

Predators
Herbivorous mammals such as goats (Capra hircus) and deer (Cervus elaphus) have a severe impact on karamu, and hares (Lepus timidus) and rabbits (Oryctolagus cuniculus) eat the seedlings.(Brockie, 1992). Additional consumers of karamu are Batracomorphus, Batracomorphus adventitiosus, leafhoppers and Membracoidea.

Interactions
Birds which disperse karamu seeds include native bellbirds (Anthornis melanura) and Tuis (Prosthemadera novaeseelandiae), indigenous silvereyes (Zosterops lateralis), and introduced blackbirds (Turdus merula), and song thrushes (Turdus philomelos). Seeds can be dispersed a long way and into areas of more mature forest. According to the database in Encyclopedia of Life, additional species that interact karau are Acalitus, Acalitus cottieri, Eriophyid mites, European greenfinch, and goldfinches.

Karamu and mychorrhizal fungi can make a symbiotic mutualism in roots system. Because mychorrhizal fungi can supply water and nutrients to the plant. Experiments with karamu shows its growth is assisted by the presence of mychorrhizal fungi assuming there is sufficient phosphorus in the soil.

Parasites
Karamu will sometimes act as a host plant to support other plants including posocarp, totara and yellow-wood family.

Cultural uses

Medicinal uses
Juvenile shoots can be applied to release inflammation or bladder problems if boiled and then the liquid drunk. The leaves are believed by Maori to have the ability to deal with kidney troubles and bark can be and used to treat stomachache and vomiting.

Food
The mature berries of karamu can be eaten as food, and its leaves used to make a tea drink.

Dyes
Karamu is rich in dying properties including alizarin and purpurin. Traditionally Maori used it to dye flax (Phormium) fibers yellow. Sometimes leaves of karamu were put on stones and dye the food and preserve them after a hangi.

Traditions
Baptists used the leaves in a ceremony and green karamu branches will be held by tohunga in tohi for newly born babies.

Revegetation and plantings
Karamu is noted for its quick bushy growth and for this reason is commonly cultivated and frequently used for revegetation projects.

Interesting facts
Coprosma robusta is one of the first seven Coprosma species that were collected by Joseph Banks with Cook's voyage to New Zealand. At that time, Coprosma robusta was called Pelaphia lata.

In recent years, there is a report showing the sex ratio of karamu in the Riccarton Bush in Christchurch. The sex ratio of population of is female-biased with 70% of the flowering plants being female. This female-biased ratio differs from the few other counts of sex ratios in New Zealand species of Coprosma. That could be influenced by a number of factors, including the pollen and seed fecundity of the two sexes and factors affecting their sexual maturity and mortality. That is interesting because karamu is often male-biased in sex ratios. This differential survival of the sexes in long-lived species is usually attributed to differences in reproductive effort between male and female plants. In particular, the energy cost of producing ovules and fruit in female plants is greater than the cost of male flowers producing pollen. Female-biased sex ratios also occur as a consequence of differential fertilization and genetic differentiation of sex chromosomes.

References

Trees of New Zealand
robusta
Endemic flora of New Zealand